Joana Figueiredo (born 18 December 1963) is a Portuguese diver. She competed in the women's 3 metre springboard event at the 1984 Summer Olympics.

References

1963 births
Living people
Portuguese female divers
Olympic divers of Portugal
Divers at the 1984 Summer Olympics
Place of birth missing (living people)